George Edward Pateman (8 May 1910 – 1973) was an English professional footballer who played as a centre forward. He made 87 appearances in the Football League spread over eight clubs.

Career
Born in Chatham, Pateman spent his early career with Aveling & Porters, Canterbury Waverley, Gillingham, Portsmouth and Oldham Athletic. At Portsmouth he made two league appearances in October 1931. He moved from Oldham to Bradford City in June 1934, making one league appearance for the club, before moving to Clapton Orient in July 1935. He later played for Reading, Accrington Stanley, Southport, Barrow and Shorts Sports. At Southport he scored four goals in thirteen league appearances between February and April 1937.

Sources

References

1910 births
1973 deaths
People from Chatham, Kent
English footballers
Association football forwards
Gillingham F.C. players
Portsmouth F.C. players
Oldham Athletic A.F.C. players
Bradford City A.F.C. players
Leyton Orient F.C. players
Reading F.C. players
Accrington Stanley F.C. (1891) players
Southport F.C. players
Barrow A.F.C. players
Shorts Sports F.C. players
English Football League players